Zinc finger protein 383 is a protein that in humans is encoded by the ZNF383 gene.

References

Further reading

Human proteins